Molnia Bluff is a steep bluff rising to  and extending west to east for  at the southeast end of Parker Mesa in the Clare Range of Victoria Land. It was named by the Advisory Committee on Antarctic Names in 2005 after Bruce Franklin Molnia, a U.S. Geological Survey geologist who conducted seismic studies in the Southern Ocean and Antarctic marginal seas from R.V. Eltanin (1965-1966); Acting Executive Director of the Polar Research Board of the National Research Council, National Academy of Sciences, 1985–87; Chief, International Polar Programs, U.S. Geological Survey, 1987–2002; Research Geologist, U.S. Geological Survey, 2002-05

References

Mountains of Victoria Land